Arturo Yovane († September 24, 1997) was a Chilean Carabineros general who was among the first who instigated the coup d'etat project of 1973 and recruited César Mendoza to that same end. Once the dictatorship was established he was appointed minister of mining. Being part of a dissident faction within the dictatorship he was hastily removed from the ministry in 1974 and appointed ambassador at the newly established Chilean embassy in Tehran.

References

Ambassadors of Chile to Iran
Ministers of the military dictatorship of Chile (1973–1990)
Chilean Ministers of Mining
1997 deaths